Eugeniusz Żytomirski (1911–1975) was a prominent Polish poet, playwright, novelist and essayist.

Life
Born in Taganrog, Russia Empire, Żytomirski died in Toronto, Canada. He became a member of the literary group Kadra.

References

1911 births
1975 deaths
Writers from Taganrog
People from Don Host Oblast
20th-century Polish poets
Polish male novelists
Polish male dramatists and playwrights
20th-century Polish novelists
20th-century Polish dramatists and playwrights
Polish male poets
Home Army members
20th-century Polish male writers
Polish emigrants to Canada